K-123 is a  state highway in the U.S. state of Kansas. The southern terminus is at K-23 north of Hoxie, and the northern terminus is at K-383 in Dresden. Along the way K-123 intersects the western terminus of K-9 south of Dresden.

Between 1938 and 1940, K-23 was realigned to follow K-9 west to US-83, then north to US-36 and US-183 in Oberlin and at this time K-123 was created to replace the former alignment of K-23 from K-9 to Dresden. Between 1944 and 1945, K-9 was realigned to end at US-83 in Dresden. Then between 1953 and 1956, K-9 was realigned to start at K-123 south of Dresden. On April 1, 1981, K-123's northern terminus was renumbered from US-383 to K-383.

Route description
K-123 begins at K-23 north of the city of Hoxie and begins travelling east through rural farmlands. After  it curves north at an intersection with 10E and 140N. Another  farther north it intersects the western terminus of K-9, and enters into Decatur County. The highway begins to transition to rolling hills as it continues north for about  then crosses and unnamed creek. The landscape begins to transition back to rural farmlands and then another  farther north, K-123 enters the city of Dresden. The highway continues north through the city for a short distance before reaching its northern terminus at K-383. Past K-383 the roadway continues as locally maintained Kings Avenue.

The Kansas Department of Transportation (KDOT) tracks the traffic levels on its highways, and in 2017, they determined that on average the traffic varied from 240 vehicles at its northern terminus to 255 vehicles at its southern terminus. K-123 is not included in the National Highway System, a system of highways important to the nation's defense, economy, and mobility. K-123 does connect to the National Highway System at its junction with K-383.

History
Before state highways were numbered in Kansas there were auto trails, which were an informal network of marked routes that existed in the United States and Canada in the early part of the 20th century. The former Pikes Peak Ocean to Ocean Highway followed K-123's northern terminus.

In 1927, the highway that became K-123 was established as K-23. Then between July 1938 and 1940, US-183 was realigned to go east from Oberlin along US-36. At this time K-23 was realigned to follow K-9 west to US-83, then north to US-36 and US-183 in Oberlin and K-123 was created to replace the former alignment of K-23 from K-9 to Dresden. Between 1941 and 1944, US-183 and US-83 were swapped within Nebraska and a small portion into Kansas. At this time K-23 was truncated to its present-day northern terminus at US-83 and K-9 was truncated to end at K-23. Between 1944 and 1945, K-9 was realigned to end at US-83 in Dresden. In a December 20, 1950 resolution, it was approved to realign K-9 to start at K-123 south of Dresden. Then between 1953 and 1956, construction had finished and K-9 was realigned to start at K-123 south of Dresden. On April 1, 1981, K-123's northern terminus was renumbered from US-383 to K-383.

Major intersections

References

External links

Kansas Department of Transportation State Map
 KDOT: Historic State Maps

123
Transportation in Sheridan County, Kansas
Transportation in Decatur County, Kansas